Dorottya Palancsa (born 18 May 1995 in Budapest) is a Hungarian female curler.

On the international level she is two-time World mixed doubles curling champion (2013, 2015).

On the national level she is seven-time Hungarian women's curling champion (2014, 2015, 2016, 2017, 2018, 2019 and 2020), one-time Hungarian mixed curling champion (2016), eight-time Hungarian mixed doubles curling champion (2012, 2013, 2014, 2015, 2016, 2018, 2020 and 2021), three-time Hungarian junior women's curling champion (2010, 2011 and 2014), seven-time Hungarian Women's Curler of the Year (2012, 2013, 2014, 2016, 2017, 2018 and 2019).

Teams and events

Women's

Mixed

Mixed doubles

Personal life
She is from family of curlers: her father Zoltan is a curler and coach, her brother Peter is a curler and coach too.

References

External links

1995 births
Living people
Hungarian female curlers
World mixed doubles curling champions
Hungarian curling champions
Sportspeople from Budapest